Clay County is a county located in the far western part of U.S. state North Carolina. As of the 2020 census, the county population was 11,089. The county seat is Hayesville.

History
This area was occupied by the Cherokee Nation at the time of European settlement. The name of Brasstown, an unincorporated community in the county, was derived from a Cherokee term for a village location, which English speakers confused with another that meant "brass." They referred to the village as Brasstown, a translation unrelated to the Cherokee history of the site.

Migrants into the area were primarily of Scots-Irish descent, who had moved into the backcountry of the Appalachians from eastern areas. They moved south from Pennsylvania and Virginia after the American Revolution. Most became yeomen farmers and few owned slaves in the antebellum years.

In the fall of 1860, George Hayes, who was running for state representative from Cherokee County, promised his constituents to introduce legislation to organize a new county in the region. That would bring business associated with a new county seat, and make government accessible to more people. In February 1861 the legislation was introduced and passed by the North Carolina General Assembly. Clay County was formed primarily from Cherokee County, North Carolina, however a small area was taken from Macon County; it was named for statesman Henry Clay, former Secretary of State and member of the United States Senate from Kentucky. In honor of Mr. Hayes, the legislature designated the new county seat as Hayesville.

Given the interruption of the American Civil War, Clay County lacked an organized, formal government until 1868. Later that year, during the Reconstruction era, the first United States post office in the county opened in Hayesville. The first county courthouse was built in 1888; it has been listed on the National Register of Historic Places.

Since the nineteenth century, Clay County has remained largely agricultural. Given its relative isolation, in the 21st century, residents continue to be overwhelmingly of European-American ancestry.

The Clay County Progress is the local newspaper, reporting mostly county news.

Geography

It is the third-smallest county in North Carolina by land area and smallest by total area.

Clay County is bordered to the south by the state of Georgia and the Chattahoochee National Forest.  The Nantahala River forms part of its northeastern border.  The county is drained by the Hiwassee River.  In the southern part of Clay County is Chatuge Lake, on the North Carolina–Georgia border.  Much of Clay County exists within the Nantahala National Forest. Fires Creek Bear Reserve is north of the township of Tusquittee.

The eastern portion of the county is preserved as part of the Nantahala National Forest.

Climate
Clay County has a humid subtropical climate, (Cfa) according to the Köppen classification, with hot, humid summers and mild, but occasionally cold winters by the standards of the southern United States.

Like the rest of the southeastern U.S., Clay County receives abundant rainfall, which is relatively evenly distributed throughout the year. Average annual rainfall is 55.9 inches (1,420 mm).  Blizzards are rare but possible; one nicknamed the Storm of the Century hit the entire Eastern United States in March, 1993.

National protected area 
 Nantahala National Forest (part)

State and local protected areas 
 Fires Creek Wildlife Management Area (part)
 JackRabbit Mountain Recreation Area

Major water bodies 
 Buck Creek
 Chatuge Lake
 Crawford Creek
 Hiwassee River
 Little Tennessee River
 Nantahala River
 Park Creek
 Tusquitee Creek

Adjacent counties
 Cherokee County - northwest
 Macon County - east
 Union County, Georgia - southwest
 Towns County, Georgia - south
 Rabun County, Georgia - southeast
 Cherokee County - west

Major highways

Demographics

2020 census

As of the 2020 United States census, there were 11,089 people, 4,996 households, and 3,424 families residing in the county.

2000 census
As of the 2000 United States Census there were 8,775 people, 3,847 households, and 2,727 families residing in the county.  The population density was 41 people per square mile (16/km2).  There were 5,425 housing units at an average density of 25 per square mile (10/km2).  The racial makeup of the county was 98.01% White, 0.80% Black or African American, 0.33% Native American, 0.09% Asian, 0.07% Pacific Islander, 0.15% from other races, and 0.56% from two or more races.  0.83% of the population were Hispanic or Latino of any race.

There were 3,847 households, out of which 23.50% had children under the age of 18 living with them, 59.80% were married couples living together, 7.50% had a female householder with no husband present, and 29.10% were non-families. 26.30% of all households were made up of individuals, and 14.40% had someone living alone who was 65 years of age or older.  The average household size was 2.25 and the average family size was 2.68.

In the county, the population was spread out, with 18.60% under the age of 18, 6.20% from 18 to 24, 22.80% from 25 to 44, 29.80% from 45 to 64, and 22.70% who were 65 years of age or older.  The median age was 47 years. For every 100 females there were 94.90 males.  For every 100 females age 18 and over, there were 91.40 males.

The median income for a household in the county was $31,397, and the median income for a family was $38,264. Males had a median income of $29,677 versus $19,529 for females. The per capita income for the county was $18,221.  About 7.80% of families and 11.40% of the population were below the poverty line, including 14.60% of those under age 18 and 13.00% of those age 65 or over.

Law, government, and politics

Government
The Clay County government is a constitutional body and is granted specific powers by the Constitution of North Carolina, most of which are determined by the state's General Assembly. The county is governed by an elected five member four-year term Board of Commissioners.

Politics
In the North Carolina Senate, Clay County is part of the 50th Senate district and is represented by Republican Jim Davis. In the North Carolina House of Representatives, Clay County is part of the 120th district, represented by Republican Kevin Corbin.

No Democratic presidential candidate has won Clay County since Jimmy Carter in 1976. Bill Clinton in 1996 was the last Democratic candidate to reach forty percent of the county's vote. Before the Progressive Era, Clay County was uniformly Democratic, but since Charles Evans Hughes became the first Republican to carry the county in 1916, it has voted for the GOP in all but five elections.

Law and public safety
The Clay County sheriff's office is the sole policing agency for the county. The sheriff protects the court and county owned facilities, manages the jail, and provides patrol and detective services.

Communities

Town
 Hayesville (county seat and largest town)

Unincorporated communities
 Brasstown
 Elf
 Tusquittee
 Warne

Townships
The county is divided into six townships:

 Brasstown comprises the westernmost township
 Hayesville is centrally located and home to the county seat
 Hiawassee, named after the major river in the region, is the smallest township, surrounding Chatuge Lake
 Shooting Creek is the easternmost township
 Sweetwater is a small township northwest of Hayesville
 Tusquittee is one of the larger townships and the most northern

See also
 List of counties in North Carolina
 National Register of Historic Places listings in Clay County, North Carolina
 List of Highway Historical Markers in Clay County, North Carolina
 List of national forests of the United States

References

External links

 
 
 Smoky Mountain Sentinel - official website of newspaper in Clay County

 
Counties of Appalachia
1861 establishments in North Carolina
Populated places established in 1861